Evgeny Kovalev (born 6 March 1989 in Moscow) is a Russian professional cyclist, who last competed with the Russian Helicopters squad. At the 2012 Summer Olympics, he competed in the Men's team pursuit for the national team. His brother Ivan Kovalev is also a racing cyclist.

Palmarès

2009
1st Stage 2 Bałtyk–Karkonosze Tour
8th Tour of Vojvodina II
10th Trofeo Banca Popolare di Vicenza
2010
1st Stage 3 Grand Prix of Adygeya
2013
1st Stage 1 Vuelta Ciclista a Costa Rica
2014
1st Stage 5 Grand Prix Udmurtskaya Pravda

References

External links

Russian male cyclists
1989 births
Living people
Olympic cyclists of Russia
Cyclists at the 2008 Summer Olympics
Cyclists at the 2012 Summer Olympics
Russian track cyclists
Cyclists from Moscow